Shari Ellin Redstone (born April 14, 1954) is an American media executive. She currently serves as the non-executive chairwoman of Paramount Global (formerly known as ViacomCBS) and president of National Amusements, and is a former vice-chairman of CBS Corporation and Viacom. Through National Amusements, Redstone and her family are majority owners of CBS, Comedy Central, BET, Showtime Networks, Nickelodeon, MTV and the film studio Paramount Pictures.

In 2020, Redstone was named on Times list of the 100 most influential people in the world, and in 2022, to Forbes''' list of the World's 100 Most Powerful Women.

Early life and education
Redstone is the daughter of Phyllis Gloria Raphael and Sumner Redstone, and the sister of Brent Redstone. Her grandfather was Michael Redstone, who was the original founder of National Amusements, the parent company that now owns the majority of the Redstone media empire. She graduated with a Bachelor of Science from Tufts University in 1975. She later received her J.D. degree in 1978 and her LL.M. degree in 1980 from Boston University School of Law.

Redstone practiced corporate law, estate planning and criminal law in the Boston area before joining National Amusements.

Career
1990s–2016
Since 1999, she has been president of National Amusements, one of the top ten movie exhibitors in the United States. Redstone has expanded the company's international footprint and its exploration of new technologies.

In 2007, Redstone and her father feuded publicly over issues of corporate governance and the future of the cinema chain. Documents have been made public which verify that, as part of a settlement from Sumner's first divorce, all of Sumner's stock is in irrevocable trusts that will be left to his grandchildren.

In 2010, Redstone and her partners purchased the theaters that they had built, and formed Rising Star Media, of which she was chairman, and turned it into the country's top-grossing cinema chain. Redstone and her partners then sold Rising Star Media to Russian theater operator Cinema Park in 2011.

In 2011, Redstone became co-founder and managing partner of Advancit Capital LLC, an investment platform focusing on early stage in media, entertainment and technology. She was also a co-chairman of MovieTickets.com (before being sold to Fandango Media in 2017), Inc. and is a member of the Board of Directors and Executive Committee for the National Association of Theatre Owners (NATO).

2016–present
On February 3, 2016, her father resigned as CBS executive chairman after questions arose about his mental competency. CBS's board then offered Shari Redstone the position of non-executive chair, but she declined. The CBS board announced that Les Moonves replaced Sumner Redstone as CBS Chairman. In 2016, Redstone, who at the time was vice chairperson of CBS and Viacom and president of National Amusements (the controlling shareholder of CBS and Viacom), gave the following statement on succession: "my father's Trust states his intention that I succeed him as (non-executive) Chairman at CBS and Viacom, and also names me as a Trustee after his death." She stated that she wanted the chairs of each company to be "not a Trustee of my father's trust or otherwise intertwined in Redstone family matters," and she nominated Les as the CBS chair.

On February 4, 2016, against Shari Redstone's desires, Viacom's board of directors named Philippe Dauman, already the CEO and president, the chairman, replacing Sumner Redstone.

On January 17, 2018, The Wall Street Journal'' reported that Shari Redstone was pushing for CBS Corp. to merge with Viacom, with Redstone also gathering names for new board members at CBS.

On August 13, 2019, the Associated Press reported that Shari Redstone had become the chair of the board for the reuniting of CBS and Viacom as ViacomCBS, today known as Paramount Global. 

In May 2020, she was named as a defendant in a lawsuit filed by the Bucks County Retirement Fund and the International Union of Operating Engineers, over the perceived "destruction of value" caused by the CBS and Viacom merger. In January 2021, a Delaware judge said former CBS shareholders could sue Shari Redstone for pressuring the company to enter the merger, and in 2022, Redstone and Viacom sued a group of insurers for refusing to cover legal bills incurred by the court battle.

Personal life
Redstone married and divorced Rabbi Ira A. Korff, and they had three children:

 Kimberlee Korff Ostheimer, a lawyer who practiced at The Legal Aid Society. She is a 2004 graduate of the University of Pennsylvania who received her law degree from the Benjamin N. Cardozo School of Law.
 Brandon Korff, a 2006 George Washington University graduate and real estate developer.
 Tyler Korff, a lawyer and rabbi who graduated from Maimonides School and Columbia University in 2008, and received his law degree from Brooklyn Law School.

Her ex-husband was president and director of National Amusements until two years after they divorced.

Philanthropy
As of January 2018, Redstone is a member of the board of directors at Combined Jewish Philanthropies and the board of trustees at Dana Farber Cancer Institute.  She is also on the board of directors of The National Center on Addiction and Substance Abuse (CASA) at Columbia University and the John F. Kennedy Library Foundation. Redstone recently joined the board and executive committee of "Our Time", a mass-membership organization that stands for the economic interests and political inclusion of young Americans aged 18–30. She sits on the local advisory board and executive committee for BUILD, a nonprofit organization that uses entrepreneurship to propel low income youth through high school and into college.

References

Further reading

External links
 The Talented Ms. Redstone (2002)
 Tufts E-News: Media Mogul In Training (May 2, 2002)
 Redstone Split Bears On Future Of Viacom, CBS (July 19, 2007)
 A father-daughter rift at Viacom (2007-07-19)

1954 births
Living people
Jewish American philanthropists
American entertainment industry businesspeople
Tufts University alumni
Boston University School of Law alumni
Shari
Chairmen of ViacomCBS
21st-century American Jews
20th-century American businesswomen
American women business executives
21st-century American businesswomen
20th-century American businesspeople
21st-century American businesspeople
Businesspeople from Washington, D.C.
21st-century American philanthropists
American women philanthropists
20th-century American Jews